Gore Creek is a tributary of the Eagle River, approximately  long, in Eagle County, Colorado, United States,

Description
The river drains an area of the Rocky Mountains at the south end of the Gore Range through Gore Valley. Downstream of this confluence, it runs alongside the route of U.S. Highway 6 (built in 1940) and Interstate 70.

While the downstream portions of Gore Creek remain a Gold Medal Brown Trout fishery, the health of aquatic life in the creek has come into question.  Due to low counts of aquatic macroinvertebrates, the Colorado Department of Public Health and Environment placed Gore Creek on a state list of impaired waterways in 2011. This raised the alarm in communities along the creek and a team of organizations including the Eagle River Watershed Council, Eagle River Water and Sanitation District and the Town of Vail have come together to restore Gore Creek.

These organizations are calling on citizens and visitors of the Gore Creek Watershed not to pour pollutants down storm sewers, to replace lawns and pavement with native plants and to follow all manufacturer-recommended guidelines when applying fertilizers or pesticides, especially on windy days or when rain is in the forecast. Efforts like these can go a long way toward keeping harmful pollutants out of the creek and helping revive important aquatic insect populations that trout and other wildlife depend on.

See also

 List of rivers of Colorado
 List of tributaries of the Colorado River

References

External links

Rivers of Eagle County, Colorado
Rivers of Colorado
Tributaries of the Colorado River in Colorado